Peter Baker (1887–1973), born Bedouin Ferran, also known as Ahmad Ali Ferran and Faron Ahmed upon death, was a Lebanese-born Canadian trader, politician, and author. As the first Muslim elected to public office in Canada, he played a fundamental role in the history of Islam in the Arctic and Subarctic regions.

Early life
Baker was born in 1887 as Bedouin Ferran or as Ahmad Ali Ferran on the territory of Levant, which is now Lebanon.

At the turn of the century, he emigrated to Canada from the Turkish (Ottoman) conscription for young Arabs whom Turkey made to fight against the Yemenis.

Ferran worked at a Holy Cross College as a labourer, and in 1909, was given his anglicised name by the college's Catholic priest. Thereonafter, he moved to the province of Alberta.

Canada
In the 1910s, Baker began work as a trapper and trader of northern fur and essentials with Canadian First Nations, establishing with his native trading partners novel and adaptive ways of both trade and credit.

After his trade ended, Baker entered politics, and was elected a member of the Legislative Assembly of the Northwest Territories for the period of 1964–1967. He was one of the earliest Muslim politicians in Canada.

Baker's funeral took place on 13 November 1973 in Al-Rashid Mosque in Edmonton, Alberta. Notably, Baker was identified in the 17 November 1973 press of Edmonton Journal's Deaths and Notices section as "Faron Ahmed, 62".

Baker authored a book, Memoirs of an Arctic Arab, published posthumously in 1976.

References

1887 births
1973 deaths
Members of the Legislative Assembly of the Northwest Territories
Canadian Muslims
Emigrants from the Ottoman Empire to Canada
Canadian politicians of Lebanese descent